Dan Spring (born October 31, 1951) is a Canadian former professional ice hockey forward.

Early life and education 
Spring was born in Rossland, British Columbia, and grew up in Cranbrook, British Columbia. He played junior hockey with the Edmonton Oil Kings.

Career 
Spring was drafted in the first round, 12th overall, by the Chicago Black Hawks in the 1971 NHL Amateur Draft. He never played in the National Hockey League; however, he played 201 games in the World Hockey Association over three seasons with the Winnipeg Jets and the Edmonton Oilers.

Career statistics
                                            --- Regular season ---  ---- Playoffs ----
Season   Team                        Lge    GP    G    A  Pts  PIM  GP   G   A Pts PIM
--------------------------------------------------------------------------------------
1969-70  Edmonton Oil Kings          WCHL    0    0    0    0    0
1969-70  [[Oshawa Generals]]             OHA     8    1    4    5   16
1970-71  Edmonton Oil Kings          WCHL   65   43   79  122   44
1971-72  [[Dallas Black Hawks]]          CHL    59   10   28   38   35   3   1   2   3   0
1972-73  Dallas Black Hawks          CHL    47   12   21   33   14  --  --  --  --  --
1973-74  Winnipeg Jets               WHA    66    8   16   24    8   4   0   1   1   0
1974-75  Winnipeg Jets               WHA    60   19   24   43   22  --  --  --  --  --
1975-76  Edmonton Oilers             WHA    75   12   11   23    8   2   1   1   2   0
1976-77  Cranbrook Royals            WIHL    0   16   11   27    4
1977-78  Cranbrook Royals            WIHL    0   26   48   74    0
--------------------------------------------------------------------------------------
         WHA totals                        201   39   51   90   38   6   1   2   3   0

External links

1971 NHL Entry Draft - Dan Spring

References 

1951 births
Living people
Canadian ice hockey forwards
Chicago Blackhawks draft picks
Dallas Black Hawks players
Edmonton Oil Kings (WCHL) players
Edmonton Oilers (WHA) players
Ice hockey people from British Columbia
National Hockey League first-round draft picks
Oshawa Generals players
Sportspeople from Cranbrook, British Columbia
People from Rossland, British Columbia
Winnipeg Jets (WHA) players